Groveland is an unincorporated community in McPherson County, Kansas, United States.  It is located southwest of McPherson at K-61 highway and Comanche Rd.

History
The post office in Groveland closed in 1912.

Education
The community is served by Inman USD 448 public school district.

See also
 Lake Inman

References

Further reading

External links
 McPherson County maps: Current, Historic, KDOT

Unincorporated communities in McPherson County, Kansas
Unincorporated communities in Kansas
1912 establishments in Kansas